{{Infobox rugby team
| teamname    = Ebbw Vale RFC
| fullname    = Ebbw Vale Rugby Football Club
| nickname    = The Steelmen
| image       = New ebbw vale rfc logo.png
| location    = Ebbw Vale, Wales
| founded     = 1879<ref>Smith (1980) p. 11</ref>
| ground      = 1919 - 1973 Welfare Ground
1973 - 2021 Eugene Cross Park
2021 - Present Ciner Glass Community Stadium

| capacity    = 8,000
| president   = 
| chairman    = 
| coach       = Jason Strange
| captain     = Joe Franchi
| league      = Principality Premiership
| season      = 2017-18
| position    = 6th (Principality Premiership)
| url         = www.evrfc.co.uk
| pattern_la1 = _redshoulders |pattern_b1 = _greenredwhitehoops |pattern_ra1 = _redshoulders
| leftarm1    = DE0005 |body1 = 006400 |rightarm1 = DE0005 |shorts1 = DE0005 |socks1 = 114511
| pattern_la2 = |pattern_b2 = _bulls12aw |pattern_ra2 = 
| leftarm2    = F052A6 |body2 = |rightarm2 = F052A6 |shorts2 = F052A6 |socks2 = F052A6
}}

Ebbw Vale Rugby Football Club is a Welsh Rugby Union Club based in the town of Ebbw Vale, Blaenau Gwent, South Wales.

The club play in the Welsh Premiership and act as a feeder club for the Dragons regional team.

History

Evidence of rugby union being played in Ebbw Vale is noted around 1879. Ebbw Vale RFC applied for and achieved Welsh Rugby Union (then known as the Welsh Football Union) membership between 1893 and 1894.

In 1907, the committee of Ebbw Vale rugby club voted 63–20 to switch from amateur rugby union to professional rugby league. Deals were made with the Northern Union, and on 26 July 1907 Ebbw Vale RFC became Ebbw Vale RLFC. The club, its players and members were all suspended from rugby union activities by the Welsh Rugby Union, though after Ebbw Vale RLFC collapsed in 1912, Ebbw Vale were readmitted as a union team after World War I.

In 1927 due to falling gate receipts, caused by the increasing attraction of rival sports such as football, Ebbw Vale staged a rugby league game on their pitch, the Welfare Ground. The WRU reacted strongly and threatened Ebbw Vale RFC with expulsion from the league. This was seen by many as an overly aggressive stance to a club that was desperate for aid not sanctions. By 1932 the gate at Ebbw Vale rarely reached twenty shillings, despite a catchment area population of 40,000. The club was forced to resort to public subscriptions.

Rugby union continued in Ebbw Vale during World War II due to the vital services provided by the steel and coal industry and Ebbw Vale was undefeated in 1940/1941. But by the mid 1950s Ebbw Vale RFC was once again becoming a prosperous club. Although seen as one of the most successful clubs on and off the playing field throughout the 1950s, Ebbw Vale was under-represented in the Welsh national team. Around the same time joint teams drawn from Ebbw Vale and neighbours Abertillery played New Zealand, Australia and South Africa international touring sides. These games were usually close encounters but with only one win – against Australia in 1958.
In the 60/61 season the Athletic side, captained by Ken Cameron, lost only one game. Their players were a consistent source of supply to the 1st XV.
The club has the dubious distinction of being on the receiving end of the heaviest defeat in Heineken Cup history going down 108–16 away to Toulouse in 1998 conceding 16 tries in the process. Although Ebbw Vale did have revenge, defeating Toulouse in the return fixture.

In April 2010 the club's relegation to WRU Division One East was confirmed.

In April 2011 Ebbw Vale were crowned WRU Division One East Champions after gaining a bonus point win in their final league game at Bedlinog. In what was a remarkable run-in to the end of the season, Ebbw picked up 44 league points from their final 9 league games (out of a possible 45) to overhaul Newbridge and win the league title at the first attempt.

In April 2012 Ebbw Vale retained the WRU Division One East title with one game in hand, following a 52–0 victory over Tredegar. The season was also marked by a remarkable cup run which saw them defeat Newport, Carmerthen Quins and Swansea, before drawing 19–19 to Cross Keys in the semi-final (Cross Keys subsequently progressed by virtue of tries scored 2–1).

In April 2013 Ebbw Vale were crowned inaugural champions of the newly formed WRU National Championship, pitting the best teams from east and west against one another. In a season that marked the club's third league title win in a row the Steelmen won 23 of 24 league games, breaking the 1000 point barrier in the process.

In April 2014 Ebbw Vale were again crowned champions of the WRU National Championship, this time gaining promotion to the Principality Premiership. They won 25 out of 26 games and amassed another 1000 point season.

In the 2015/16 season the club achieved a new height, winning the Premiership title for the first time.

 Colours and badge 
The club colours changed from black and amber to red, white and green in the 1930s. The change may have been made by Dai Regan Jones, who had played for Leicester RFC.

Their home colours of green, white and red represent the colours of the Welsh national flag with the second-choice shirt coloured light blue. The club's badge like many other clubs in Wales has a red dragon on it. The dragon is standing over a golden gate or drawbridge, over the dragons head is a semicircle with the club's motto of Iach Gorff Iach Meddwl. This semicircle is part of a bridge shape which is coloured in the club's and Welsh colours of red, green and white. All of this is incorporated into a shield shape with the club's name Ebbw Vale RFC embroidered on the bottom.

Club's motto

The club's motto is "Iach Gorff Iach Feddwl", the Welsh for "Healthy Body Healthy Mind". The origin of this motto is speculative but this is an old proverb in the Welsh Language.

Current squad

 

 

Club honours
 Snelling Sevens 1958 – Champions
 Welsh Cup Runners-up 1998–99
 WRU Division One East 2010–11 – Champions
 WRU Division One East 2011–12 – Champions
 WRU Championship 2012–13 – Champions
 WRU Championship 2013–14 – Champions
 Principality Premiership 2015–16 – Champions

Notable former players
The players listed below have played or coached rugby union or rugby league at international level and have represented or coached Ebbw Vale. See also :Category:Ebbw Vale RFC players''

Stupid Lee (on loan from Beaufort RFC)

Notable former coaches and management staff

Games played against international opposition

1A joint Ebbw Vale and Abertillery side.

External links

Bibliography

Notes

Rugby clubs established in 1879
Welsh rugby union teams
Ebbw Vale
1879 establishments in Wales